In computational complexity theory, the Immerman–Szelepcsényi theorem states that nondeterministic space complexity classes are closed under complementation. It was proven independently by Neil Immerman and Róbert Szelepcsényi in 1987, for which they shared the 1995 Gödel Prize. In its general form the theorem states that NSPACE(s(n)) = co-NSPACE(s(n)) for any function s(n) ≥ log n. The result is equivalently stated as NL = co-NL; although this is the special case when s(n) = log n, it implies the general theorem by a standard padding argument. The result solved the second LBA problem.

In other words, if a nondeterministic machine can solve a problem, another machine with the same resource bounds can solve its complement problem (with the yes and no answers reversed) in the same asymptotic amount of space. No similar result is known for the time complexity classes, and indeed it is conjectured that NP is not equal to co-NP.

The principle used to prove the theorem has become known as inductive counting. It has also been used to prove other theorems in computational complexity, including the closure of LOGCFL under complementation and the existence of error-free randomized logspace algorithms for USTCON.

Proof sketch
The theorem can be proven by showing how to translate any nondeterministic Turing machine M into another nondeterministic Turing machine that solves the complementary decision problem under the same (asymptotic) space complexity, plus a constant number of pointers and counters, which needs only a logarithmic amount of space.

The idea is to simulate all the configurations of M on input w, and to check if any configuration is accepting. This can be done within the same space plus a constant number of pointers and counters to keep track of the configurations. If no configuration is accepting, the simulating Turing machine accepts the input w. This idea is elaborated below for logarithmic NSPACE class (NL), which generalizes to larger NSPACE classes via a padding argument.

The configuration of M consists of the state, the position of the head on the tape, and the logarithmically-sized contents of the tape. A configuration can be thought of as the vertex of a directed graph, and the transitions of M can be thought of as edges in this graph. M accepts an input string whenever there exists a path in this graph from the vertex , which represents the starting configuration, to a special vertex  that represents any accepting configuration.

using the following subroutine:
If , return true
Initialize a counter  to 0
For each vertex  in the implicit graph, repeat the following steps:
If , halt the algorithm and reject the input.
When used within a larger nondeterministic algorithm, the only accepting computations of the algorithm can be ones in which the subroutine finds paths to all the reachable vertices and
computes the correct answer, so this subroutine can be used as if it were deterministic. With it in hand, the algorithm for testing non-reachability of t from s can be expressed by the following steps.
Repeat the following steps  times:
Initialize a counter  to 0
For each vertex  test whether  is reachable from  within  steps, and if so increment 
Increment  and set  to 
Test whether  is reachable from  within  steps, and reject the input if it is; otherwise, accept the input.
The algorithm only needs to maintain representations of a constant number of counters and vertices in its memory, so it uses logarithmic space. By applying this algorithm to the implicit graph constructed from a given nondeterministic machine M, one obtains a nondeterministic machine for the complementary language to the one accepted by M.

Logspace hierarchy 
As a corollary, in the same article, Immerman proved that, using descriptive complexity's equality between NL and FO(Transitive Closure), the logarithmic hierarchy, i.e. the languages decided by an alternating Turing machine in logarithmic space with a bounded number of alternation, is the same class as NL.

See also
 Savitch's theorem relates nondeterministic space classes to their deterministic counterparts

Notes

References

External links
Lance Fortnow, Foundations of Complexity, Lesson 19: The Immerman–Szelepcsenyi Theorem. Accessed 09/09/09.

Structural complexity theory
Mathematical theorems in theoretical computer science
Articles containing proofs